The Rodrigues People's Organisation (OPR) is a political party based in the Island of Rodrigues, Mauritius. 
At the legislative elections of 11 September 2000, the party won 2 out of 70 seats (both the seats allocated to Rodrigues Island).

In the 2005 elections, 3 July 2005, the party won 2 out of 70 seats.

In the 2006 regional election, OPR won 8 of 18 seats and subsequently lost government to Rodrigues Movement (MR).

In the 2012 Rodrigues election, OPR won 11 of 21 seats in the Assembly and took control of the island government from MR.

In the 2017, Rodrigues election, OPR won 10 of 17 seats.

References

Political parties in Mauritius
Politics of Rodrigues